In shooting at the 2004 Summer Olympics, 390 competitors from 106 nations contested 17 events (10 for men and 7 for women). The competition took place at the Markopoulo Olympic Shooting Centre, located in the east of the Greek region of Attica.

Qualification

Medal summary

Men's events

Women's events

Medal table

Participating nations
A total of 390 shooters, 253 men and 137 women, from 106 nations competed at the Athens Games:

See also
Shooting at the 2003 Pan American Games

References

External links

Official result book – Shooting

 
2004 Summer Olympics events
2004
Olympics
Shooting competitions in Greece